Electronic navigation are forms of navigation that ships, land vehicles, and people can use, which rely on technology powered by electricity.

Methods of electronic navigation include:

Satellite navigation, satellite navigation systems
Radio navigation, the application of radio frequencies to determining a position
Radar navigation, the use of radar to determine position relative to known objects

See also
Electronic navigational chart
Robot navigation

 
Navigation